Musicescu is a Romanian surname. Notable people with the surname include:

Florica Musicescu (1887–1969), Romanian pianist and musical pedagogue
Gavriil Musicescu (1847–1903), Romanian composer, conductor and musicologist, father of Florica

Romanian-language surnames